Diprosopus ("two-faced", from , , "two" and ,  [neuter], "face", "person"; with Latin ending), also known as craniofacial duplication (cranio- from Greek , "skull", the other parts Latin), is an extremely rare congenital disorder whereby parts (accessories) or all of the face are duplicated on the head.

Development 
Although classically considered conjoined twinning (which it resembles), diprosopus is not normally due to the fusion or incomplete separation of two embryos. It is the result of abnormal activity by the protein SHH (sonic hedgehog). (The name of this protein was inspired by the Sonic the Hedgehog video game character and is part of an idiosyncratic naming tradition in molecular biology research.)

SHH and its corresponding genes have been found to play an important role in signaling craniofacial patterning during embryonic development. Among other things, SHH governs the width of facial features. In excess it leads to widening of facial features and to duplication of facial structures. The greater the widening, the more structures are duplicated, often in a mirror image form. This has been demonstrated in the laboratory by introducing pellets of the SHH protein into chicken embryos, resulting in chickens with duplicate beaks. Inadequate amounts of that protein lead to opposite conditions such as cyclopia where facial features are insufficiently developed.

Healthy brain development is also dependent on the signaling function of SHH. During embryonic development, SHH directs embryonic cells to organize in specific areas that later become specialized neural tissues, thus controlling the size and shape of brain structures.

Occurrences 
Diprosopus often occurs in combination with other congenital disorders, particularly anencephaly, neural tube defect and cardiac malformations. When present, the brain may show abnormalities ranging from partial to complete duplication of brain structures, and/or underdevelopment of brain tissues.

Humans
Most human infants with diprosopus are stillborn. Known instances of humans with diprosopus surviving for longer than minutes to hours past birth are very rare; only a few are recorded. In 2002 and 2003, two living male infants with partial diprosopus were described in the medical literature in separate case reports. One infant was born with duplication of the nose and the cerebral frontal lobes, two widely spaced eyes, a small, underdeveloped central eye socket, and a large, asymmetric mouth. The other infant was born with duplication of the upper and lower jaw, two tongues arising from the same base, cleft palate, a slightly divided tip of the nose, and two widely spaced eyes, as well as absence of the corpus callosum, duplication of the pituitary gland and stalk, and abnormalities in the midbrain. Because they were born with a milder, partial form of diprosopus, both infants were considered candidates for surgical correction of their abnormal facial features.

Spanish case 

In January 1775, a Spanish family gave birth to a girl with diprosopus. She had 3 eyes (one a combination of 2), 2 noses, 2 mouths, and 3 chins. The child was taken on tour from village to village, and gained much attention in Spain and neighboring countries. Her case is mentioned in Nicolas-François and Geneviève Regnault's Les écarts de la nature, published that year.  Her full lifespan is unknown, but is mentioned to still be alive in French publications as late as 1777.

Lali Singh 
Lali Singh (10 March – 10 May 2008) was born to Sushma and Vinod Singh in Saini, Sunpura Sohanpur village, near Delhi; the birth was delayed by dystocia caused by her large head, and her birth in a hospital was facilitated by her mother's receiving an episiotomy. She was one of the very few infants with diprosopus to survive well past birth, and may have been the only known living individual with complete facial duplication. Her facial features included two pairs of eyes, two noses, and two mouths (but only one pair of ears). She was seen as the reincarnation of the goddess Durga, who is sometimes depicted with many limbs and eyes.

Sushma and Vinod Singh declined an offer from local doctors to evaluate their daughter through CT or MRI scanning. Without diagnostic imaging, it was not possible to know the full extent to which the child's condition might have affected her brain and other vital structures in her head and neck. Thus, any estimation of her ability to thrive or even survive could be only speculative, though Lali's family described her as functioning normally. It is also unknown whether neurosurgeons or craniofacial surgeons, if consulted, would have had feasible solutions to offer with respect to corrective surgery. A local doctor told reporters that the baby should be considered a healthy child who currently was living a normal life, a previously unknown occurrence among sufferers of the disorder.

Lali's two middle eyes suffered from corneal opacity due to abnormal anatomy of the facial muscles, which prevented her from properly closing those eyes; initially, this was wrongly blamed on camera flashes.

A cleft palate caused difficulty in her feeding under village conditions. A poor diet of bottle-fed sugar solution and diluted milk, allowed to drip down her throat, as she could not suck properly due to her cleft palate, weakened her condition, and vomiting and infection ensued. Admission to hospital was delayed by discussion (including taking her back home from hospital) among her extended family and her village's headman. Finally, her parents, alarmed at her illness and dehydration, defied her other relatives and took her back to hospital, where under proper medical treatment including antibiotic and a saline drip she started to improve, stopped vomiting, started drinking milk and defecating normally. However, six hours later, at two months old to the day, she died of a heart attack. She was buried in her village, as is usual in Hinduism with children who die very young. Later a temple was built at the village in her memory.

Faith and Hope Howie 
Faith Daisy and Hope Alice Howie (8 May – 27 May 2014) were born in Sydney, Australia, to parents Simon Howie and Renee Young. Faith and Hope shared one body and skull, but had complete duplication of the facial features, as well as duplication of the brain; both brains joined to one brain stem. Young and Howie had learned at nineteen weeks gestation of their children's condition, but opted not to terminate the pregnancy. The children were born six weeks prematurely and appeared to be doing well, able to breathe unaided several days after their birth, and they were observed to sleep and cry at different times. They died nineteen days following their birth due to unknown causes, although some sources indicated that the girls died following an operation for unknown reasons.

Other animals

Janus, a goat with two faces on one body, survived from April 5 to May 5, 2020 in Wittenberg, Wisconsin.
Few two-faced animals have survived due to associated internal organ abnormalities and brain abnormalities. One of the most famous was Ditto, a pig. Ditto was raised to adulthood, but died of pneumonia caused by food inhalation when breathing through one muzzle while eating with the other.

Cats with the condition are known as 'Janus cats', after the Roman god. In July 2006, a six-year-old male Janus cat called "Frank and Louie" from Millbury, Massachusetts, USA, received publicity. In their case, only one esophagus (and possibly only one trachea) were functional; this aided survival. In September 2011, when Frank and Louie were twelve years old, it was announced that they would appear in the 2012 Guinness Book of World Records as the longest-surviving Janus cat on record. In 2014, Frank and Louie died at the age of fifteen.

See also 
Conjoined twins
Craniopagus parasiticus
Cyclopia
Durga, a three-eyed Hindu goddess
Edward Mordake, a disputed story of a 19th-century man with a face on the back of his head
Futakuchi-onna, a female Japanese yōkai with mouth on back of her head/hair
Janus, a Roman god with two faces
Kara Mia, a Philippine TV series that tells the story of a young woman with two faces divided in one body.
Polycephaly

References

External links

‘Sonic Hedgehog’ sounded funny, at first. New York Times, 12 November 2006.
Rediscovering biology: Unit 7, Genetics of development. Expert interview transcripts, interview with John Incardona, PhD. explanation of the discovery and naming of the sonic hedgehog gene
Page for sonic hedgehog homolog (SHH)  at The Human Genome Organisation (HUGO)
Two-faced kitten has image problem at Channel4000
Two-faced kitten shocks owner, veterinarian at OregonNews.com
Two-faced cat sets record as oldest living "Janus" cat at Reuters
diprosopus kitten
diprosopus piglet
diprosopus calf
Rescue Kitten Was Born With Two Face Who Rejected By Her Cat Mom diprosopus kitten

Baby with 2 faces born in north India MSNBC
Image:Diprosopus

Congenital disorders
Facial features